Lincoln Drive is a 4.1 mile road in the Wissahickon Creek section of Philadelphia, Pennsylvania.  Initially built in 1856 as the Wissahickon Turnpike, it was not completed until about 50 years later.  The road is called the “Dead Man’s Gulch” due to its twisting and turning.  Initially, the purpose of the road was to provide access from the mills to the city of Philadelphia.

Some historic locations that the road passes include Historic RittenhouseTown, Germantown, and Chestnut Hill.

From the 1930s until 1960, Lincoln Drive was designated as the southernmost part of U.S. Route 309.

References

Roads in Pennsylvania
1856 establishments in Pennsylvania
Transportation in Philadelphia
Streets in Philadelphia